Deux heures moins le quart avant Jésus-Christ (Quarter To Two B.C.) is a 1982 French comedy film directed by Jean Yanne. The film relates the story of the garage mechanic Ben-Hur Marcel, also known as Aminemephet (Coluche), who gets wrapped up organizing a plot against Caesar (Michel Serrault). The picture is an anachronistic parody of Bible films like Ben-Hur, somewhat comparable to Monty Python's Life of Brian (1979). It has become a cult film in France.

Plot 
During the Roman Empire, a modest cart maker found himself the victim of a political plot targeting Julius Caesar.

In this parody of peplum, peopled with anachronisms, a garage mechanic for carts, Ben-Hur Marcel finds himself unwillingly representative of the union against the Roman army. Caught up in a story of a plot against a homosexual Caesar and interested only in his hairstyle and the drape of his toga, Ben-Hur Marcel finds himself embroiled in a political embarrassment towards ancient Egypt and its queen, Cleopatra VII, decked out in an accent of the Parisian suburbs. He will get by thanks to the talent of his friend Paulus.

At first glance, the satire is aimed first at state power which presents all the usual flaws: liar, cynical, manipulator, contemptuous, hateful, but also fearful: "Citizens, we can do nothing for the moment ... But as soon as possible as we can, we will do double! The people, cowardly and submissive (cf. the final speech of Ben-Hur Marcel to all the protagonists), and the operetta revolutionaries also take it for their rank: if things are going so badly, it is because , in the end, they let it go. And, in the end, everyone forgets while watching the silliness of the television news during which the birth of a child is announced in a stable in Bethlehem.

The film ends with an ironic retort from Ben-Hur Marcel: “The birth of a child in a stable won't change the face of the world!" At this moment we hear the first three fortissimo notes of the music written by Miklós Rósza for the film Ben Hur (1959) by William Wyler.

Cast
 Coluche as Ben-Hur Marcel / Aminemephet
 Michel Serrault as César
 Jean Yanne as Paulus
 Françoise Fabian as Laetitia
 Michel Auclair as Consul Demetrius
 Mimi Coutelier as Cleopatra
 Darry Cowl as Faucuius
 Paul Préboist as The Lion Keeper
 Daniel Emilfork as Tatouius
 Valérie Mairesse as A Prostitute
 André Pousse as A centurion
 Michel Constantin as Secutor
 José Artur as Reginus

Discography

The CD soundtrack composed by Raymond Alessandrini and Jean Yanne was released on the Music Box Records label.

References

External links
 

1982 films
1980s parody films
French parody films
1980s French-language films
Films directed by Jean Yanne
Films produced by Claude Berri
French satirical films
Films set in Palestine (region)
Films set in the Roman Empire
Films shot in Tunisia
Films set in the 1st century BC
Roman Empire in art and culture
Depictions of Julius Caesar on film
Depictions of Cleopatra on film
1982 comedy films
1980s French films